Justice Dewey may refer to:

Charles Dewey (Indiana judge) (1784–1862), associate justice of the Indiana Supreme Court
Charles Augustus Dewey (1793–1866), associate justice of the Massachusetts Supreme Judicial Court
Daniel Dewey (1766–1815), associate justice of the Massachusetts Supreme Judicial Court